Diving disorders, or diving related medical conditions, are conditions associated with underwater diving, and include both conditions unique to underwater diving, and those that also occur during other activities. This second group further divides into conditions caused by exposure to ambient pressures significantly different from surface atmospheric pressure, and a range of conditions caused by general environment and equipment associated with diving activities.

Disorders particularly associated with diving include those caused by variations in ambient pressure, such as barotraumas of descent and ascent, decompression sickness and those caused by exposure to elevated ambient pressure, such as some types of gas toxicity. There are also non-dysbaric disorders associated with diving, which include the effects of the aquatic environment, such as drowning, which also are common to other water users, and disorders caused by the equipment or associated factors, such as carbon dioxide and carbon monoxide poisoning. General environmental conditions can lead to another group of disorders, which include hypothermia and motion sickness, injuries by marine and aquatic organisms, contaminated waters, man-made hazards, and ergonomic problems with equipment. Finally there are pre-existing medical and psychological conditions which increase the risk of being affected by a diving disorder, which may be aggravated by adverse side effects of medications and other drug use.

Treatment depends on the specific disorder, but often includes oxygen therapy, which is standard first aid for most diving accidents, and is hardly ever contra-indicated for a person medically fit to dive, and hyperbaric therapy is the definitive treatment for  decompression sickness. Screening for medical fitness to dive can reduce some of the risk for some of the disorders.

Effects of variation in ambient pressure 

Many diving accidents or illnesses are related to the effect of pressure on gases in the body;

Barotrauma

Barotrauma is physical injury to body tissues caused by a difference in pressure between a gas space inside or in contact with the body, and the surroundings.

Barotrauma occurs when the difference in pressure between the surroundings and the gas space makes the gas expand in volume, distorting adjacent tissues enough to rupture cells or damage tissue by deformation. A special case, where pressure in tissue is reduced to the level that causes dissolved gas to come out of solution as bubbles, is called decompression sickness,  the bends, or caisson disease.

Several organs are susceptible to barotrauma, however the cause is well understood and procedures for avoidance are clear. Nevertheless, barotrauma occurs and can be life-threatening, and procedures for first aid and further treatment are an important part of diving medicine.

Barotraumas of descent (squeezes)
Ear squeeze (also alternobaric vertigo)
Sinus squeeze (aerosinusitis)
Tooth squeeze (dental barotrauma, barodontalgia)
Mask squeeze
Helmet squeeze
Suit squeeze
Barotraumas of ascent (overexpansion injuries)
Lung overexpansion injury (pulmonary barotrauma) – rupture of lung tissue allowing air to enter tissues, blood vessels, or spaces between or surrounding organs:
Pneumothorax: Free air in the pleural cavity, leading to collapsed lung.
Interstitial emphysema: Gas trapped in the spaces between tissues.
Mediastinal emphysema: Gas trapped around the heart.
Subcutaneous emphysema: Free gas under the skin.
Arterial gas embolism: Air or other breathing gas in the blood stream, causing blockage of small blood vessels.
Intestinal gas overexpansion
Middle ear overpressure (reversed ear) (also alternobaric vertigo)
Sinus overpressure (aerosinusitis)
Tooth overpressure (dental barotrauma, barodontalgia)

Compression arthralgia

Decompression sickness

Dysbaric osteonecrosis

High pressure nervous syndrome

Nitrogen narcosis

Oxygen toxicity

Non-dysbaric disorders associated with diving

Drowning

Salt water aspiration syndrome

Hypoxia

Swimming induced pulmonary edema

Immersion diuresis

Hypercapnia

Carbon monoxide poisoning

Lipid pneumonia

Environmental hazards 

Hazards in the underwater environment that can affect divers include marine life, marine infections, polluted water, ocean currents, waves and surges and man-made hazards such as boats, fishing lines and underwater construction. Diving medical personnel need to be able to recognize and treat accidents from large and small predators and poisonous creatures, appropriately diagnose and treat marine infections and illnesses from pollution as well as diverse maladies such as sea sickness, traveler's diarrhea and malaria.

Hypothermia

Non-freezing cold injuries

Frostbite

Hyperthermia

Seasickness

Cramps

A cramp is a sudden, involuntary, painful muscle contraction or overshortening; while generally temporary and non-damaging, they can cause significant pain and a paralysis-like immobility of the affected muscle. Muscle cramps are common and are often associated with pregnancy, physical exercise or overexertion, age (common in older adults), or may be a sign of a motor neuron disorder.

Cramps may occur in a skeletal muscle or smooth muscle. Skeletal muscle cramps may be caused by muscle fatigue or a lack of electrolytes such as sodium (a condition called hyponatremia), potassium (called hypokalemia), or magnesium (called hypomagnesemia). Some skeletal muscle cramps do not have a known cause. Cramps of smooth muscle may be due to menstruation or gastroenteritis. Motor neuron disorders (e.g., amyotrophic lateral sclerosis), metabolic disorders (e.g., liver failure), some medications (e.g., diuretics and inhaled beta‐agonists), and haemodialysis may also cause muscle cramps.

A cramp usually starts suddenly and it also usually goes away on its own over a period of several seconds, minutes, or hours.

Injury caused by marine animals

Envenomation

Bites

Blunt trauma

Contamination from polluted waters 
In most places, contamination comes from a variety of sources (non-point source pollution). In a few it is primarily pollution from a single industrial source. The more immediate threat is from locations where high concentrations of toxic or pathogenic pollutants are present, but lower concentrations of less immediately harmful contaminants can have a longer term influence on the diver's health. Three major categories of contamination can cause health and safety problems for divers. These are biological, chemical and radioactive materials.

The risks from hazardous materials are generally proportional to dosage - exposure time and concentration, and the effects of the material on the body. This is particularly the case with chemical and radiological contaminants. There may be a threshold limit value which will not usually produce ill effects over long-term exposure. Others may have a cumulative effect.

The United Nations identification numbers for hazardous materials classifies hazardous materials under 9 categories:
 Explosives
 Gases, which may be compressed, liquified or dissolved under pressure
 Flammable liquids
 Flammable solids
 Oxidising agents
 Poisonous and infectious substances
 Radioactive substances
 Corrosive substances
 Miscellaneous hazardous substances
A contaminant may be classed under one or more of these categories.

Poisonous substances are also classified in 9 categories:
 Irritants
 Simple asphyxiants
 Blood asphyxiants
 Tissue asphyxiants
 Respiratory paralysers
 Liver and kidney toxins
 Substances that affect the muscles (myotoxins)
 Substances that affect bone marrow
 Substances that interfere with nerve function (neurotoxins)

Trauma due to the natural physical environment 

Water movement due to waves or currents may wash the diver against hard or sharp edged obstacles, or the movement of the diver may cause impact, or unstable bottom formations may fall onto the diver, causing injury.

Injuries caused by man-made hazards 

In addition to mechanisms similar to those for natural hazards, injuries caused by impact with the dive boat or other vessels or their moving parts, like propellers and thrusters, and by tools and equipment is possible. The nature of work related injury depends on the task and equipment in use.

Disorders caused by the diving equipment 
A variety of disorders may be caused by ergonomic problems due to poorly fitting equipment.

Temporomandibular joint dysfunction is pain or tenderness in the jaw, headache or facial ache caused by gripping the regulator mouthpiece between the teeth of the upper and lower jaws. This action is required to retain the mouthpiece in place for the duration of the dive, and may strain the masticatory muscles or the temporomandibular joint, which is where the lower jawbone (mandible) hinges on the skull at the temporal bone. This problem can be aggravated by cold water, stress, and strong water movement, and can be reduced by use of custom mouthpieces with longer and more rigid bite grip surfaces, which allow better support of the second stage with less effort.
Leg and foot cramps may be caused by unaccustomed exercise, cold, or ill-fitting fins.
Lower back pain may be caused by a heavy weightbelt hanging from the small of the back, counteracting the buoyancy of the diving suit which is distributed over the full length of the diver. This effect can be reduced by use of integrated weight systems which support the weights over the length of the back on the diving harness backplate.
Restricted circulation to the hands may be caused by excessively tight dry suit cuff seals.

Treatment 

Treatment of diving disorders depends on the specific disorder or combination of disorders, but two treatments are commonly associated with first aid and definitive treatment where diving is involved. These are first aid oxygen administration at high concentration, which is seldom contraindicated, and generally recommended as a default option in diving accidents where there is any significant probability of hypoxia, and hyperbaric oxygen therapy (HBO), which is the definitive treatment for most incidences of decompression illness. Hyperbaric treatment on other breathing gases is also used for treatment of decompression sickness if HBO is inadequate.

Oxygen therapy 

The administration of oxygen as a medical intervention is common in diving medicine, both for first aid and for longer-term treatment.

Hyperbaric therapy 

Recompression treatment in a hyperbaric chamber was initially used as a life-saving tool to treat decompression sickness in caisson workers and divers who stayed too long at depth and developed decompression sickness. Now, it is a highly specialized treatment modality that has been found to be effective in the treatment of many conditions where the administration of oxygen under pressure has been found to be beneficial. Studies have shown it to be quite effective in some 13 indications approved by the Undersea and Hyperbaric Medical Society.

Hyperbaric oxygen treatment is generally preferred when effective, as it is usually a more efficient and lower risk method of reducing symptoms of decompression illness, However, in some cases recompression to pressures where oxygen toxicity is unacceptable may be required to eliminate the bubbles in the tissues that cause the symptoms.

Fitness to dive 

All divers should be free of conditions and illnesses that would negatively impact their safety and well-being underwater. The diving medical physician should be able to identify, treat and advise divers about illnesses and conditions that would cause them to be at increased risk for a diving accident.

Some reasons why a person should not be considered fit to dive are as follows:

Disorders that lead to altered consciousness: conditions that produce reduced awareness or sedation from medication, drugs, marijuana or alcohol; fainting, heart problems and seizure activity.
Disorders that substantially increase the risk of barotrauma injury conditions or diseases that are associated with air trapping in closed spaces, such as sinuses, middle ear, lungs and gastrointestinal tract. Severe asthma is an example.
Disorders that may lead to erratic and irresponsible behavior: included here would be immaturity, psychiatric disorders, diving while under the influence of medications, drugs and alcohol or any medical disorder that results in cognitive defects.

Conditions that may increase risk of diving disorders, but are not necessarily absolute contraindications:
Patent foramen ovale
Diabetes mellitus — No serious problems should be expected during dives due to hypoglycaemia in divers with well-controlled diabetes. Long-term complications of diabetes should be considered and may be a contrindication.
Asthma

Conditions considered temporary reasons to suspend diving activities:
Pregnancy—It is unlikely that literature research can establish the effect of scuba diving on the unborn human fetus as there is insufficient data, and women tend to comply with the diving industry recommendation not to dive while pregnant.

Long-term health effects of diving

Dysbaric osteonecrosis is ischemic bone disease thought to be caused by decompression bubbles, though the definitive pathologic process is poorly understood. It is a significant occupational hazard, which may follow a single exposure to compressed air, and may occur with no history of DCS, but is usually associated with significant compressed air exposure. The distribution of lesions differs with the type of exposure - the juxta-articular lesions being more common in caisson workers than in divers.
There is a definite relationship between length of time exposed to extreme depths and the percentage of divers with bone lesions. Evidence does not suggest that dysbaric osteonecrosis is a significant risk in recreational scuba diving.

Exposure to increased partial pressure of oxygen during diving can raise the level of oxidative stress in which increased production of free radicals can occur. The combined influence of diving-related factors on free radical production and the long-term effects on diver resilience and health are not yet understood. Diving, and other forms of exercise, can precondition individuals for protection in further dives. It is not yet known if this preconditioning can influence resilience in other environmental extremes.

The mortality rate in recreational diving is very low, and the risk of accidental drowning is unlikely have a significant influence on the average life expectancy of divers. Risk of accidental drowning and other diving accidents can be reduced by following safe diving practices.

References 

Diving medicine